Year 1336 (MCCCXXXVI) was a leap year starting on Monday (link will display the full calendar) of the Julian calendar.

Events 
 February 25
 Rather than be taken captive by the Teutonic Knights, 4,000 defenders of Pilėnai, Lithuania commit mass suicide.
 The Kenmu Restoration ends and the Muromachi period begins in Japan; start of the Nanboku-chō period.
 April 18 (unconfirmed) – Brothers Harihara and Bukka Raya found the Vijayanagara Empire on the southern part of the Deccan Plateau in South India.
 April 26 – The Ascent of Mount Ventoux is made by the Italian poet Petrarch: he claims to be the first since classical antiquity to climb a mountain for the view.
 May 19 – The governor of Baghdad, Oirat 'Ali Padsah, defeats Arpa Ke'un near Maraga, contributing to the disintegration of the Ilkhanate.
 July 4 – Battle of Minatogawa: Ashikaga Takauji defeats Japanese Imperial forces, under Kusunoki Masashige and Nitta Yoshisada.
 July 21–22 – Aberdeen, Scotland is burned by the English.
 September 20 – The reign of Emperor Kōmyō, second of the Ashikaga Pretenders to the Northern Court of Japan, begins.

Births 
 April 9 – Timur, founder of the Timurid Empire (d. 1405)
 July 25 – Albert I, Duke of Bavaria (d. 1404)
 date unknown 
 Gao Qi, Chinese poet (d. 1374)
 Cyprian, Metropolitan of Kiev (died 1406)
 probable
 Stefan Uroš V, Emperor of the Serbs (d. 1371)

Deaths 

 January 20 – John de Bohun, 5th Earl of Hereford (b. 1306)
 February 25 – Margiris, Duke of Samogitia
 March 20 – Maurice Csák, Hungarian Dominican friar (b. c. 1270)
 May 17 – Emperor Go-Fushimi of Japan (b. 1288)
 July 4 – Elizabeth of Portugal, queen consort and saint (b. 1271)
 September 5 – Charles d'Évreux (b. 1305)
 date unknown
 Bernard VIII, Count of Comminges (b. c. 1285)
 Arpa Ke'un, Ilkhanid ruler
 Guillaume Pierre Godin, French Dominican philosopher (b. c. 1260)
 Hugh II of Arborea
 Ramon Muntaner, Catalan soldier and writer (b. 1270)
 Cino da Pistoia, Italian poet (b. 1270)
 Richard of Wallingford, English monk and mathematician (b. 1292)
 Ghiyas al-Din ibn Rashid al-Din, Ilkhanate politician
 Turgut Alp, Kayi and Ottoman soldier and commander in-chief (b. 1200) at the age of 136.

References